The Republic of Korea passport, commonly referred to as the South Korean passport, is issued to a South Korean citizen to facilitate their international travel. Like any other passport, South Korean passports serve as proof for passport holders' personal information, such as nationality and date of birth. South Korean passports are issued by the Ministry of Foreign Affairs and have been printed by the Korea Minting and Security Printing Corporation (KOMSCO) since 1973. On 21 December 2021, issuing the next generation biometric passports to South Korean citizens has begun, which was delayed by one year as planned due to the COVID-19 pandemic.

Types
Ordinary passport (일반여권): Issued to normal citizens. Ordinary passports are issued for one, five, or ten years of validity, depending on age of bearer (see below for details). 
Diplomatic passport (외교관여권): Issued to President, Prime Minister, Minister and Deputy Ministers of Foreign Affairs of Korea, diplomats and citizens who serve under diplomatic terms. These passports guarantee special treatment in other countries.
Official passport (관용여권): Issued to members of Parliament of Korea, members of Provincial Legislatures and civil servants in Government of Korea, Provincial Governments and Local Municipalities during his or her term.

Expiration & Cost

 KRW ₩25,000 for a new passport with the same date of expiry as one's previous passport.
 KRW ₩5,000 to change details on one's old passport.

Physical appearance 
South Korean ordinary passports are dark blue, with the National Emblem of the Republic of Korea emblazoned in gold in the top right of the front cover. The words '' (Korean) and 'REPUBLIC OF KOREA PASSPORT' (English) 
are inscribed below the Emblem, whereas the international e-passport symbol is inscribed on the bottom right of the front cover. Lastly, the Taegeuk mark with dotted circles is embossed on the left side of the front cover.

Difference with DPRK passport
In North Korea, the Korean word for 'passport is spelled '려권' (ryeogwon), whereas in South Korea, the same word is written as '여권' (yeogwon).

Identity Information Page

Photo of the passport holder
 Type (PM or PR or PS): PM passports can be used for multiple entries, while PS passports are valid for a single entry. PR passports are for Koreans who are permanent residents of countries other than Korea. However, the PR type passport has been abolished as of 21 December 2017, and permanent residents of other countries now receive a normal passport
 Issuing country code: KOR'''
 Passport number: Includes a total of nine digits; in passports issued from 25 August 2008 onward, the passport number will retain the same 9 digits, but the Issued Local code will be changed to a single letter 'M' denoting PM passports and 'S' for PS passports. The remaining 8 digits will be the serial number.
Surname: Passports from other nations such as Bulgaria and Greece have the bearer's name written in the local script alongside the Latin alphabet. However, in the South Korean passport, only the Latin alphabet is permitted for use in the surname and given name sections. Their local script name is written in the separate hangul name section.
Given names
Hangul name
Date of birth
Sex
Nationality: Republic of Korea
 Issuing authority: Ministry of Foreign Affairs
 Date of issue
 Date of expiry

Information removed from new passports since 21 December 2021

 Personal ID number (Resident registration number of South Korea): Prior to 2015, South Korean passports issued to Zainichi Koreans did not have resident registration numbers, reflecting their statutory exemption from taxation and conscription in South Korea (Conversely, Zainichi Koreans were not allowed to vote. However, from 2012, all Korean passport holders are eligible to vote, and in 2015, Zainichi Koreans were allowed to obtain a resident registration number regardless of their statutory exemptions).

 Passport message 
The message inside South Korean passports are written in both Korean and English. The message in the passport, nominally from the South Korean Minister of Foreign Affairs, states:

In Korean:

In English:The Ministry of Foreign Affairs of the Republic of Korea requests all whom it may concern to permit the bearer, a national of the Republic of Korea, to pass freely without delay or hindrance and to provide every possible assistance and protection in case of need.'

Languages
The textual portions of passports are printed in both English and Korean.

Biometric passport 
The South Korean government has been issuing biometric passports since February 2008 for diplomats and government officials, and for the general population since 24 August 2008.

The South Korean Ministry of Foreign Affairs formed the "Committee for Promoting e-Passports" in April 2006, which scheduled to issue biometric passports during the second half of 2008. On 4 September 2007, media reports indicated that the South Korean government had decided to revise its passport law to issue biometric passports which included fingerprint information: First to diplomats during the first quarter of 2008, and to the general public during the second half of the year. Some civil groups have protested the fingerprinting requirement as excessive as the ICAO only requires a photograph to be recorded on the biometric chip.

On 26 February 2008, the South Korean legislature passed a revision of the passport law. A new biometric passport was issued to diplomats in March, and to the general public shortly thereafter. Fingerprinting measures would not be implemented immediately; however, they began on 1 January 2010.

The appearance of the new biometric passports is almost identical to the former machine-readable versions, and they both have 48 pages. However, the space for visas was reduced by six pages. These pages are now reserved for identification purposes, notices and other information, as well as the bearer's contacts. In the new biometric passports, the main identification page has moved to the second page from inside the front cover. The note from the Foreign Affairs Minister is still shown on the front page and the signature is shown on the page after photo identification.

The new biometric passport incorporates many security features such as colour shifting ink, hologram, ghost image, infrared ink, intaglio, laser perforation of the passport number (from the third page to the back cover), latent image, microprinting, security thread, solvent sensitive ink, and steganography.

Inside the first page, a caution for the biometric chip is written both in Korean,

and in English,
"This passport contains sensitive electronics, For best performance please do not bend, perforate or expose to extreme temperatures or excess moisture."
The passport holders' contact information that was originally held inside the back cover has also been moved to the last page of the new passport.

New passports issued from 2021 
From 21 December 2021, the Ministry of Foreign Affairs issues a new biometric passport. The passport has been redesigned entirely with improvements in security. The identification page is made of polycarbonate in order to make it harder to forge. The colour of the cover of the ordinary passport has changed from green to navy blue. The bearer's personal ID number (Resident registration number of South Korea) is removed from the passport for greater security. The new passport was originally intended to be issued from June 2020 for diplomatic and official passports holders and December 2020 for those holding an ordinary passport. However, due to the COVID-19 pandemic, the number of traveling citizens declined resulting in the delay of the new passport's introduction until late 2021 or whenever the current passport booklet stock is depleted. Diplomatic and officials passports are issued as planned.

Production
As of January 2009, the Korea Minting and Security Printing Corporation takes eight hours to produce the new biometric passport and is capable of producing 26,500 passports per day.

Visa free travel

Visa requirements for South Korean citizens are administrative entry restrictions by the authorities of other states placed on citizens of Republic of Korea. As of 19 September 2022, South Korean citizens had visa-free or visa on arrival access to 192 countries and territories, ranking the South Korean passport second in the world in terms of travel freedom (tied with the Singaporean passport, and one ranking down from the Japanese passport) according to the Henley Passport Index. Additionally, Arton Capital's Passport Index currently rank the South Korean passport third in the world in terms of travel freedom, with a visa-free score of 165 (tied with Danish, Dutch, French, Finnish, Italian, Luxembourgish, Norwegian, Singaporean, Spanish, Swedish and United States passports), as of 15 January 2019.

As of October 2018, the passports of South Korea, Brunei and Chile are the only ones to provide visa-free access to all G8 countries.

Inter-Korean travel
The South Korean (Republic of Korea) constitution considers North Korea (Democratic People's Republic of Korea) as part of its territory, although under a different administration. In other words, the South does not view going to and from the North as breaking the continuity of a person's stay, as long as the traveler does not land on third country, i.e. non-Korean, territory.

However, because of the political situation between the South and the isolated socialist Juche government of North Korea, it is almost impossible to enter the North from the South across the Korean DMZ (exiting South Korea via the northern border). Tourists wishing to enter North Korea have to pass through another country, and most enter from China, because most flights to/from Pyongyang serve Beijing.

South Koreans are generally not allowed to visit North Korea, except with special authorizations granted by the Ministry of Unification and North Korean authorities on a limited basis (e.g. workers and businessmen visiting or commuting to/from Kaesong Industrial Complex). South Koreans who are allowed to visit North Korea are issued a North Korean visa on a separate sheet of paper, not in the South Korean passport. The Republic of Korea passport can be used to enter North Korea, because passport is one of the government's approved identity documents, but it is being only to prove the bearer's identity, not to determine the bearer's legal residence. South Koreans can also use other government approved identity documents such as National ID Card and Driver's License, because the South Korean government treats North Korea as part of South Korea and expects South Korean IDs to be accepted.

In 1998, visa-free travel to the tourist resort of Mount Kumgang and the Kaesong Industrial Region was made possible under the "sunshine policy" orchestrated by South Korean President Kim Dae-jung. Those wishing to travel across the DMZ were given special travel certificates issued by the Ministry of Unification through Hyundai Asan. In July 2008, a female tourist named Park Wang-ja was shot to death by a North Korean guard on a beach near Mount Kumgang, which led to the suspension of the tours. As of March 2010 all travel across the DMZ has now been suspended due to increasing tensions between North and South Korea. However, in 2018, Kim Jong-un and others went to South Korea through the DMZ and met up with South Korean officials. They discussed reunification.

There are four land border checkpoints in South Korea for inter-Korea travel.

Restricted nations
The South Korean government has banned Afghanistan, Iraq, Libya, Somalia, Syria and Yemen as travel destinations for safety reasons.

Gallery of South Korean passports

See also
Biometric passports
List of passports
Visa Waiver Program
Visa policy of South Korea
South Korean nationality law
Visa requirements for South Korean citizens
Korean Empire passport
North Korean passport

References

External links

Korea, Republic of South
Foreign relations of South Korea